Brodie Smith (born 14 January 1992) is a professional Australian rules football player who plays for the Adelaide Football Club in the Australian Football League (AFL).

Early life
Smith participated in the Auskick program at West Lakes, South Australia. He played senior football for the Henley Football Club in the SAAFL and Woodville West Torrens Football Club in the South Australia National Football League.

Smith was Adelaide's first selection in the 2010 National Draft at pick 14 overall.

AFL career
Smith made his debut in round 1 of his very first season, 2011, against . He played 14 games in his first season and showed plenty of maturity for a first-year player, averaging 13 disposals per game. He played 22 games including three finals in 2012 as a running defender, shutting down opposition forwards such as Steve Johnson and providing run off half-back, also becoming noted for kicking goals from long range. Despite fracturing his collarbone in the 2013 pre-season, Smith played the final 18 games of the season, continuing to play mainly at half-back. He played his 50th game in round 19 against  and gathered a career-high 29 possessions in the last game against .

Smith signed a new contract with the Crows early in the 2014 season, keeping him at the club until 2016. He went on to have a career-best year at the club, averaging 23 disposals and ranking first in the competition for long kicks and second for rebound 50s and metres gained. This earned him selection in the All-Australian team and in the Australian international rules football team for the 2014 International Rules Test. Smith remained one of the AFL's most damaging half-backs in 2015, recovering from two concussions early in the season to lead the club in rebound 50s and finish fifth in the AFL for metres gained.

In the First Qualifying Final against  in 2017, Smith tore his ACL in the first quarter after kicking the Crows' first goal for the match. The injury ended his season, but Adelaide went on to win the match by 36 points. Due to the nature of his injury, he missed the majority of the 2018 season.

Statistics
 Statistics are correct to Round 23 2021

|- style="background:#eaeaea;"
! scope="row" style="text-align:center" | 2011
| style="text-align:center" | 
| 33 || 14 || 2 || 1 || 107 || 76 || 183 || 38 || 38 || 0.1 || 0.1 || 7.6 || 5.4 || 13.1 || 2.7 || 2.7
|-
! scope="row" style="text-align:center" | 2012
| style="text-align:center" | 
| 33 || 22 || 5 || 5 || 230 || 141 || 371 || 82 || 45 || 0.2 || 0.2 || 10.5 || 6.4 || 16.9 || 3.7 || 2.1
|- style="background:#eaeaea;"
! scope="row" style="text-align:center" | 2013
| style="text-align:center" | 
| 33 || 18 || 3 || 3 || 223 || 121 || 344 || 69 || 25 || 0.2 || 0.2 || 12.4 || 6.7 || 19.1 || 3.8 || 1.4
|-
! scope="row" style="text-align:center" | 2014
| style="text-align:center" | 
| 33 || 22 || 11 || 8 || 287 || 209 || 496 || 108 || 35 || 0.5 || 0.4 || 13.1 || 9.5 || 22.6 || 4.9 || 1.6
|- style="background:#eaeaea;"
! scope="row" style="text-align:center" | 2015
| style="text-align:center" | 
| 33 || 21 || 7 || 6 || 266 || 116 || 382 || 82 || 39 || 0.3 || 0.3 || 12.7 || 5.5 || 18.2 || 3.9 || 1.9
|-
! scope="row" style="text-align:center" | 2016
| style="text-align:center" | 
| 33 || 23 || 7 || 12 || 305 || 170 || 475 || 100 || 52 || 0.3 || 0.5 || 13.2 || 7.3 || 20.6 || 4.3 || 2.2
|-
! scope="row" style="text-align:center" | 2017
| style="text-align:center" | 
| 33 || 23 || 12 || 9 || 289 || 180 || 469 || 107 || 46 || 0.5 || 0.3 || 12.5 || 7.8 || 20.3 || 4.6 || 2.0
|-
! scope="row" style="text-align:center" | 2018
| style="text-align:center" | 
| 33 || 2 || 0 || 0 || 17 || 26 || 43 || 10 || 7 || 0.0 || 0.0 || 8.5 || 13.0 || 21.5 || 5.0 || 3.5
|-
! scope="row" style="text-align:center" | 2019
| style="text-align:center" | 
| 33 || 22 || 10 || 12 || 326 || 178 || 504 || 109 || 55 || 0.4 || 0.5 || 14.8 || 8.0 || 22.9 || 4.9 || 2.5
|-
! scope="row" style="text-align:center" | 2020
| style="text-align:center" | 
| 33 || 16 || 5 || 6 || 203 || 72 || 275 || 58 || 38 || 0.3 || 0.3 || 12.6 || 4.5 || 17.1 || 3.6 || 2.3
|-
! scope="row" style="text-align:center" | 2021
| style="text-align:center" | 
| 33 || 21 || 2 || 4 || 332 || 101 || 433 || 107 || 38 || 0.0 || 0.1 || 15.8 || 4.8 || 20.6 || 5.0 || 1.8
|- class="sortbottom"
! colspan=3| Career
! 204
! 64
! 66
! 2585
! 1390
! 3975
! 870
! 417
! 0.3
! 0.3
! 12.6
! 6.8
! 19.4
! 4.2
! 2.0
|}

References

External links

1992 births
Living people
Australian rules footballers from South Australia
Australian people of Scottish descent
Australian people of English descent
Adelaide Football Club players
Woodville-West Torrens Football Club players
All-Australians (AFL)
Australia international rules football team players